Nanopsocus oceanicus is a species of thick barklouse in the family Pachytroctidae. It is found in Africa, Australia, the Caribbean, Europe, Northern Asia (excluding China), Central America, North America, South America, and Southern Asia.

References

Pachytroctidae
Articles created by Qbugbot
Insects described in 1928